12 Deadly Days is a 2016 American comedy horror anthology series produced exclusively for YouTube Red, it was created by Chris Cullari and Jennifer Raite and starred Anna Akana, Jon Fletcher, J. Claude Deering, and Kaitlin Doubleday and other Internet personalities. The series premiered on December 12, 2016. The season finale was released on December 22, 2016. The 12 episodes series is produced by Blumhouse Television and Dakota Pictures.

The series is set in the cursed town of Saturn, California, during the 12 days leading up to Christmas. Filmed in Pomona, CA.

Episodes

Season 1

References

External links 

American comedy web series
2016 web series debuts
YouTube Premium original series
Horror fiction web series
2012 web series endings